Nikitinka is a rural locality (a village) in Gafurovsky Selsoviet, Tuymazinsky District, Bashkortostan, Russia. The population was 303 as of 2010. There are 3 streets.

Geography 
Nikitinka is located 16 km southeast of Tuymazy (the district's administrative centre) by road. Vozdvizhenka is the nearest rural locality.

References 

Rural localities in Tuymazinsky District